Australian Paper is the only Australian manufacturer of office, printing and packaging papers and manufactures more than 600,000 tonnes of paper annually for Australia, New Zealand and other export markets. Australian Paper was purchased from Paperlinx by Nippon Paper Industries in June 2009.

Manufacturing facilities
It has two manufacturing facilities: the Maryvale Mill in the Latrobe Valley and a manufacturing facility in Preston.

In February 2015 Australian Paper announced the closure of the Shoalhaven Paper Mill in Bomaderry, New South Wales. The mill closed in July 2015.

In April 2015 Australian Paper opened a new A$90 million paper recycling plant at the Maryvale Mill. The plant can process up to 80,000 tonnes of wastepaper a year.

Environmental impact
Australian Paper has a contract with the Victorian Government for the period 1996-2030 of buying wood at a 1996 fixed price on the logs. This includes mountain ash timber, deemed by scientists to be of high conservation value. In August 2011 Australian Paper withdrew from Forest Stewardship Council (FSC) certification, in order to be able to use wood from old-growth forest logging by VicForests, but remained under the certification of the Australian Forestry Standard. Their previous auditor SmartWood was suspended in September 2011 as result of an FSC internal audit. Later the company announced that its FSC certification has been retained for all products except Reflex paper. As of 2013, the Reflex 100% recycled paper is FSC certified.

See also

List of paper mills

References

External links
Official website

Pulp and paper companies of Australia
Nippon Paper Industries
Australian companies established in 1895
Manufacturing companies established in 1895
Printing companies of Australia
Playing card manufacturers
Manufacturing companies based in Melbourne
Printing companies
2009 mergers and acquisitions